The men's hammer throw was an event at the 1956 Summer Olympics in Melbourne, Australia. The qualifying round and the final both were held on Saturday November 24, 1956. There were 22 competitors from 14 nations. The maximum number of athletes per nation had been set at 3 since the 1930 Olympic Congress. The event was won by American Hal Connolly, the nation's first victory in the event since 1924 and seventh overall. Mikhail Krivonosov (silver) and Anatoli Samotsvetov (bronze) earned the Soviet Union's first medals in the event.

Background

This was the 12th appearance of the event, which has been held at every Summer Olympics except 1896. Four of the 25 finalists from the 1952 Games returned: gold medalist József Csermák of Hungary, seventh-place finisher Sverre Strandli of Norway, twenty-first-place finisher Peter Allday of Great Britain, and Mikhail Krivonosov of the Soviet Union, who had failed to set a legal mark in the final. Krivonosov had become one of the best hammer throwers in the world between the Games, winning the European championship and breaking the world record seven times. Krivonosov held the world record for almost two years, improving it almost 3 metres in the process. Earlier in the month, Hal Connolly had taken the world record, adding over a metre to the mark Mikhail Krivonosov had thrown just 11 days earlier.

Australia and Poland each made their debut in the event. The United States appeared for the 12th time, the only nation to have competed at each appearance of the event to that point.

Summary

The leader in qualifying was Anatoli Samotsvetov. Samotsvetov took the lead with an Olympic record 62.10 metres in the first round; the three Soviets holding the medal positions. In the second round, Krivonosov improved the Olympic record to 63.00 metres. American Al Hall moved into third place with 61.83 metres to break up the Soviet bloc. In the third round, Krivonosov upped the record 3 more centimetres and Connolly moved into second with a 62.65 metres. In the fifth round, Connolly became the third person of the day to break the Olympic record, throwing the winner . Samotsvetov made a final throw of 62.56 metres to secure his hold on bronze, but Krivonosov's only answers were fouls, leaving him with the silver.

In a much publicized Olympic romance, Connolly would marry Czechoslovak discus throw champion, Olga Fikotová.

Competition format

The competition used the two-round format introduced in 1936, with the qualifying round completely separate from the divided final. In qualifying, each athlete received three attempts; those recording a mark of at least 54.00 metres advanced to the final (a significant increase from the 49.00 metres used in 1952, which resulted in 25 finalists). If fewer than 12 athletes achieved that distance, the top 12 would advance. The results of the qualifying round were then ignored. Finalists received three throws each, with the top six competitors receiving an additional three attempts. The best distance among those six throws counted.

Records

Prior to the competition, the existing world and Olympic records were as follows.

Anatoli Samotsvetov was the first thrower in the final; he immediately broke the Olympic record with 62.10 metres. Mikhail Krivonosov beat that mark with 63.00 metres in the second throw, and improved the record again with 63.03 metres in the third. Hal Connolly took over the record, and won the gold medal, with 63.19 metres in the fifth throw.

Schedule

All times are Australian Eastern Standard Time (UTC+10)

Results

Qualifying

Blair, who had thrown 65.95 metres earlier in 1956, was removed from the United States team for violating amateurism rules by assisting a The Boston Globe sportswriter.

Final

References

External links
 Official Report
 Results

M
Hammer throw at the Olympics
Men's events at the 1956 Summer Olympics